Senecio fremontii, the dwarf mountain ragwort, is a species of the family Asteraceae. It takes its scientific name from John C. Frémont.

References

External links
 
 
  Calflora Database: Senecio fremontii (Fremont's groundsel, Dwarf mountain ragwort)
 Calflora Database: Senecio fremontii var. fremontii — Cascade Range, Sierra Nevada.
 Calflora Database: Senecio fremontii var. occidentalis (Western Fremont's groundsel) — endemic to Central + Southern Sierra Nevada.
 USDA Plants Profile for Senecio fremontii (dwarf mountain ragwort)

fremontii
Flora of California
Flora of Colorado
Flora of Idaho
Flora of Montana
Flora of New Mexico
Flora of Nevada
Flora of Oregon
Flora of Utah
Flora of Washington (state)
Flora of Wyoming
Flora of Alberta
Flora of British Columbia
Flora of the Cascade Range
Flora of the Sierra Nevada (United States)
John C. Frémont
Taxa named by Asa Gray
Taxa named by John Torrey
Flora without expected TNC conservation status